Serranus is a genus of fish in the family Serranidae. It is one of five genera known commonly as the "Atlantic dwarf sea basses". These fish are hermaphrodites, each individual possessing functional male and female reproductive tissues. When a pair spawns, one fish acts as a male and the other acts as a female.

Species
There are currently 31 recognized species in this genus:
 Serranus accraensis (Norman, 1931) (Ghanean comber)
 Serranus aequidens C. H. Gilbert, 1890 (Deep-water bass)
 Serranus aliceae Carvalho-Filho & C. E. L. Ferreira, 2013 
 Serranus annularis (Günther, 1880) (Orange-back bass)
 Serranus atricauda Günther, 1874 (Blacktail comber)
 Serranus atrobranchus (Cuvier, 1829) (Black-ear bass)
 Serranus baldwini (Evermann & Marsh, 1899) (Lantern bass)
 Serranus cabrilla (Linnaeus, 1758) (Comber)
 Serranus chionaraia C. R. Robins & Starck, 1961 (Snow bass)
 Serranus drewesi Iwamoto, 2018 (Drewes' bass)
 Serranus flaviventris (Cuvier, 1829) (Twin-spot bass)
 Serranus hepatus (Linnaeus, 1758) (Brown comber)
 Serranus heterurus (Cadenat, 1937)
 Serranus huascarii Steindachner, 1900 (Flag bass)
 Serranus inexpectatus Wirtz & Iwamoto, 2018
 Serranus luciopercanus Poey, 1852 (Cross-hatch bass)
 Serranus maytagi C. R. Robins & Starck, 1961
 Serranus notospilus Longley, 1935 (Saddle bass)
 Serranus novemcinctus Kner, 1864 (Barred bass)
 Serranus phoebe Poey, 1851 
 Serranus psittacinus Valenciennes, 1846 (Barred comber)
 Serranus pulcher Wirtz & Iwamoto, 2016 (São Tomé comber) 
 Serranus sanctaehelenae Boulenger, 1895 (St. Helena comber)
 Serranus scriba (Linnaeus, 1758) (Painted comber)
 Serranus socorroensis G. R. Allen & D. R. Robertson, 1992 (Socorro bass)
 Serranus stilbostigma (D. S. Jordan & Bollman, 1890)
 Serranus subligarius (Cope, 1870) (Belted bass)
 Serranus tabacarius (Cuvier, 1829) (Tobaccofish)
 Serranus tico G. R. Allen & D. R. Robertson, 1998
 Serranus tigrinus (Bloch, 1790) (Harlequin bass)
 Serranus tortugarum Longley, 1935 (Chalk bass)

References

Serraninae
Extant Thanetian first appearances
Taxa named by Georges Cuvier
Taxonomy articles created by Polbot